Judgement 5 was a professional wrestling event promoted by DDT Pro-Wrestling (DDT). It took place on March 28, 2001, in Tokyo, Japan, at the Kitazawa Town Hall. It was the fifth event under the Judgement name.

Storylines
Judgement 5 featured five professional wrestling matches that involved different wrestlers from pre-existing scripted feuds and storylines. Wrestlers portrayed villains, heroes, or less distinguishable characters in the scripted events that built tension and culminated in a wrestling match or series of matches.

Event
During the event, at around 2:37 pm, Chotaro Kamoi pinned Shark Tsuchiya to become the 47th Ironman Heavymetalweight Champion.

Results

References

External links
The official DDT Pro-Wrestling website

5
2001 in professional wrestling
Professional wrestling in Tokyo